The Albanian Power Corporation, known as KESH – Energy of Albania, is the largest government-owned electricity producing company in Albania.
KESH operates the most important electricity generating plants in the country. They include: The Drin River Cascade hydropower plants (Fierza HPP, Komani HPP and Vau i Dejës HPP), with an installed power capacity of 1,350 MW, and the
Vlora TPP, with an installed power capacity of 98 MW. The cascade, built on the Drin River, is the largest in the Balkan region by installed capacity, as well as by the size of the hydropower plants.

By operating 79% of the generation capacity in the country, KESH supplies about 70-75% of the customers' demand for electricity, provides the energy needed to cover the losses in the transmission grid, as well as guarantees the security of the Albanian energy system through balancing energy and auxiliary
services. KESH is also responsible for the administration, the proper operation as well as for guaranteeing the technical and operational safety of the power plants it operates.

See also
 OSHEE (Electric Power Distribution Operator)
 OST (Transmission System Operator)
 ERE (Energy Regulatory Authority)
 Electricity distribution companies by country

References

Electric power companies of Albania
Government-owned energy companies